The FC Basel 1945–46 season was the fifty-third season since the club's foundation on 15 November 1893. FC Basel played their home games in the Landhof in the district Wettstein in Kleinbasel. Emil Junker was the club's chairman. It was his second year as president of the club.

Overview 
Max Barras was first team manager for the second season. Basel played a total of 42 games in their 1945–46 season. Of these 26 in the Nationalliga B, three in the Swiss Cup and 13 were test games. The test games resulted with seven victories, one draw and five defeats. In total, they won 28 games, drew six and lost eight times. In total, including the test games and the cup competition, they scored 141 goals and conceded 55.

Basel had suffered relegation the previous season and their clear aim was to obtain immediate promotion. The Nationalliga B was contested by 14 teams. The two teams that finished at the top of the division were to be promoted and the two teams that finished in last and second last position in the league table would be relegated. Basel played a good season, winning 19 league matches, drawing five, losing only two matches. Thus they ended the season with 43 points in 1st position four points ahead of Urania Genève Sport in 2nd position and these two clubs won promotion.

In the Swiss Cup Basel started in the 3rd principal round with an away tie against lower tier local side SC Schöftland this ended with a 5–1 victory. In the round of 32 Basel had an away game against Nationalliga B team Fribourg which ended with a 4–0 win. In the round of 16 Basel had a home game at the Landhof against higher tier Servette and were knocked out of the competition.

Players 

 
 

 

 
 
 

  

 
 

Players who left the squad

Results

Legend

Friendly matches

Pre-season

Winter break to end of season

Nationalliga

League matches

League table

Swiss Cup

See also 
 History of FC Basel
 List of FC Basel players
 List of FC Basel seasons

References

Sources 
 Rotblau: Jahrbuch Saison 2014/2015. Publisher: FC Basel Marketing AG. 
 Die ersten 125 Jahre. Publisher: Josef Zindel im Friedrich Reinhardt Verlag, Basel. 
 The FCB team 1945–46 at fcb-archiv.ch
 Switzerland 1945–46 by Erik Garin at Rec.Sport.Soccer Statistics Foundation

External links
 FC Basel official site

FC Basel seasons
Basel